Webber Township is one of sixteen townships in Jefferson County, Illinois, USA.  As of the 2010 census, its population was 2,323 and it contained 943 housing units.

Geography
The township is centered at 38°20′N 88°45′W (38.342,-88.757). It is transversed from east–west by State Route 15.

Cities, towns, villages
 Bluford

Unincorporated towns
 Markham City at 
 Marlow at 
(This list is based on USGS data and may include former settlements.)

Adjacent townships
 Farrington Township (north)
 Hickory Hill Township, Wayne County (northeast)
 Four Mile Township, Wayne County (east)
 Pendleton Township (south)
 Mt. Vernon Township (west)
 Field Township (northwest)

Cemeteries
The township contains these seven cemeteries: Black Oak Ridge, Clark, East Hickory Hill, Hicory Hill, Mount Olive, Newton Farm and Oak Dale.

Major highways
  Illinois Route 15

Demographics

Political districts
 Illinois's 19th congressional district
 State House District 107
 State Senate District 54

References
 
 United States Census Bureau 2007 TIGER/Line Shapefiles
 United States National Atlas

External links
 City-Data.com
 Illinois State Archives

Townships in Jefferson County, Illinois
Mount Vernon, Illinois micropolitan area
Townships in Illinois